The List of Wells Fargo Directors includes all members of the Board of Directors of the express mail company from its founding in 1852 until the cessation of its express service in 1918. It does not include the directors of the Wells Fargo Bank after it became a separate institution in 1905.

Directors of Wells Fargo & Company 1852–1918
E. G. Allen, 1884
Ashbel H. Barney, 1859–1883
Danford N. Barney, 1853–1870
John Bermingham, 1897–1902
John Bloodgood, 1869–1870
Charles B. Brigham, 1878–79
John Butterfield, 1867–1868
Burns D. Caldwell, 1912–1918
Benjamin Pierce Cheney, 1854–1877, 1882–1884, 1893–1895
Benjamin Pierce Cheney Jr., 1895–1899
Andrew Christeson, 1899–1902, 1913–1918
George E. Cook, 1869–1870
W. D. Cornish, 1904–1909
Charles Crocker, 1877–1884, 1884–1888
Charles Frederick Crocker, 1879–1882, 1883–1894, 1895–1897
Frederic V. S. Crosby, 1909–1910
Prince S. Crowell, 1869–1870
H. W. De Forest, 1907–1918
Richard Delafield (expressman), 1910–1918
D. L. Einstein, 1869–1870
Oliver Eldridge, 1872–1884, 1884–1901
Dudley Evans, 1892–1894, 1894–1910
Charles Fargo, 1869–1870, 1884–1886
J. C. Fargo, 1867–1872, 1881–1884, 1885–1893
William Fargo, 1852–1866, 1867–1881
William H. Fogg, 1867–1870
Charles W. Ford, 1869–1870
Charles H. Gardiner, 1900–1901
W. F. Goad, 1889–1893
George E. Gray, 1879–1910
C. R. Greathouse, 1874–1875
James Ben Ali Haggin, 1872–1879
E. H. Harriman, 1902–1909
W. Averell Harriman, 1914–1918
James Heron, 1884
William F. Herrin, 1904–1918
Ben Holladay, 1867–1869
Mark Hopkins Jr., 1872–1878
Bela M. Hughes, 1884
Charles J. Hughes, 1884
Collis Potter Huntington, 1870–1872
Henry E. Huntington, 1893–1918
Thomas M. Janes, 1856–1858
Eugene Kelly, 1867–1870
Homer S. King, 1893–1905
Henry Kip, 1869–1870
Stuart R. Knott, 1907–1909
Julius Kruttschnitt, 1904–1910
Charles F. Latham, 1863–1867
Milton Latham, 1870–1872
Johnston Livingston, 1852–1870
Leonor F. Loree, 1910–1918
Robert S. Lovett, 1905–1907
William Mahl, 1909–1914
John James McCook, 1893–1911
James McKay (expressman), 1852–1859
Louis McLane (expressman), 1866–1870
Darius Ogden Mills, 1870–1874, 1875–1882
Edwin B. Morgan, 1852–1858, 1858–1867, 1868–1870
William Norris (expressman) 1886–1892
William I. Pardee 1854–1856
H. B. Parsons 1904–1907
Charles A. Peabody 1910–1918
Alpheus Reynolds 1852–1854
Henry D. Rice 1852–1854
Jacob Schiff 1914–1918
Alexander M.C. Smith 1852–1854
William Sproule 1910–1913
Leland Stanford 1870–1884, 1884–1893
E. A. Stedman 1910–1918
Aaron Stein 1894–1895, 1900
Nathan Stein, 1901–1902
N. H. Stockwell, 1858–1867
Lloyd Tevis, 1870–1893
Oakleigh Thorne, 1902–1918
Frederick Douglas Underwood, 1902–1918
John J. Valentine Sr., 1882–1901
W. T. Van Brunt, 1902–1907
A. K. Van Deventer, 1909–1910
S. A. Walker, 1884
Paul Warburg, 1910–1914
Henry Wells, 1852–1867
Elijah P. Williams, 1852–1863

See also
History of Wells Fargo
List of Wells Fargo presidents

References

.Directors
.WF
.WF